Didier Mollard (born 4 December 1969) is a former French ski jumper who competed from 1986 to 1997. At the 1992 Winter Olympics in Albertville, he finished eighth in the individual normal hill event.

Mollard's best individual finish at the FIS Nordic World Ski Championships was sixth in the large hill event at Trondheim in 1997. He finished 29th at the 1994 Ski-flying World Championships in Planica.

Mollard best World Cup career finish was second twice, both in 1993.

References

External links

Ski jumpers at the 1988 Winter Olympics
Ski jumpers at the 1992 Winter Olympics
Ski jumpers at the 1994 Winter Olympics
French male ski jumpers
Olympic ski jumpers of France
Living people
1969 births
Sportspeople from Chambéry